CLN may refer to:

Computing and technology
 Class Library for Numbers, a free software project
 Computer Learning Network, a technical school (college) in Mechanicsburg, Pennsylvania; see YTI Career Institute

Politics and government
 Certificate of Loss of Nationality, an American form
 National Liberation Committee, the underground political entity of Italian Partisans during the German occupation of Italy

Other
 Catamount Library Network, a library consortium in Vermont
 Chapeltown railway station, in South Yorkshire
 Credit-linked note, a security issued by a special purpose company or trust
 Sri Lanka's International Telecommunication Union abbreviation; see List of ITU letter codes

See also
Genes related to neuronal ceroid lipofuscinosis: CLN3, CLN5, CLN6, CLN8